Maidenhall is a district of Luton, in the Luton district, in the ceremonial county of Bedfordshire, England, north of the town centre and Bury Park, centred on Maidenhall Road, according to a limited number of sources. It is referenced on bus timetables and in one newspaper article. Maidenhall is not mentioned in the final revision of The Story of Luton, which is considered to be the definitive history of the town.

The area is roughly bounded by the Midland Main Line to the north, Hatters Way to the south, Roman Road, Beechwood Road, Waller Avenue and Chaul End Lane to the west, and Highfield Road and Claremont Road to the east.

The area contains a mix of residential, industrial and commercial premises.

Politics 
Maidenhall straddles the Biscot, Challney, Dallow and Saints wards of Luton. The area is also in the two parliamentary constituencies of Luton North and Luton South.

References 

Areas of Luton